"Love Doesn't Have to Hurt" is a song by English girl group Atomic Kitten. It was written by Susanna Hoffs of the Bangles along with Billy Steinberg, and Tom Kelly and recorded for the band's second studio album, Feels So Good (2002). Production on "Love Doesn't Have to Hurt" was helmed by Bill Padley and Jem Godfrey, with Martin Harrington and Ash Howes credited as additional producers. Initially recorded by Hoffs, it was later given to Atomic Kitten whose rendition of the Bangles' 1988 song "Eternal Flame" had been a number-one success the year before.

The acoustic-framed mid-tempo ballad was released as the fourth and final single from Feels So Good on 31 March 2003. It peaked at number 4 on the UK Singles Chart, becoming the album's fourth consecutive top five hit in the United Kingdom, and reached number 13 on the Irish Singles Chart, also reaching the top twenty on a composite Eurochart Hot 100. Atomic Kitten reteamed with frequent collaborator Phil Griffin to film a music video for "Love Doesn't Have to Hurt" which depicts them in different rooms in a futuristic house, intercut by group performances.

Background
"Love Doesn't Have to Hurt" was co-written by Susanna Hoffs of American pop rock band the Bangles and spurred by Atomic Kitten's 2001 rendition of their 1988 song "Eternal Flame." Initially recorded for one of Hoff's solo projects, it was eventually given to the band when they began collecting material for their second stdio album. Billy Steinberg and Tom Kelly are also credited as writers. Production on the album version was overseen by Bill Padley and Jem Godfrey. The single version of "Love Doesn't Have to Hurt" varies from the album version, as the vocals of Natasha Hamilton, Liz McClarnon and Jenny Frost were re-recorded to give the song a more powerful vocal range, and the music had been remastered to give the acoustic-framed mid-tempo ballad a smoother finish. Martin Harrington and Ash Howes are credited as additional producers on this version.

Chart performance
The song debuted and peaked at number four on the UK Singles Chart. This gave Atomic Kitten their ninth top-10 single and sixth consecutive top-five hit in the United Kingdom. However, "Love Doesn't Have to Hurt" quickly fell out of the top 10 the next week, where it gained a place on the charts at number 12. It would remain another nine weeks on the chart. In Ireland, the song reached the top 20, peaking at number 13 on the Irish Singles Chart, and became Feels So Goods only single not to reach the top 10. "Love Doesn't Have to Hurt" was not released elsewhere, but debuted and peaked at number 65 on the Single Top 100 in the Netherlands, where it became Aotmic Kitten's lowest-charting single. It remained on the chart for nine weeks.

Music video
Atomic Kitten reteamed with frequent collaborator Phil Griffin to produce a video for "Love Doesn't Have to Hurt". Their sixth video with Griffin, it is set in a plush futuristic apartment with oversized corridors. The video opens with the three girls going into a photo. The first lines are sung by Frost, dressed in a silk bathrobe, who is seen sitting near a sink in a bathroom, while she is looking at some photographs. Beginning with the second verse, the video shifts to McClarnon who is leaving her bedroom to find a corridor filled with helium balloons. When the bridge sets in, Hamilton is seen painting her nails in the living room, while she watches videos on television. In the final chorus, the trio reunites in one of the corridors to perform together.

Track listings

Notes
  denotes additional producer

Credits and personnel
Credits adapted from the liner notes of Feels So Good.

 Atomic Kitten – vocals
 Carrie Grant – additional vocal production
 Susanna Hoffs – writing
 Tom Kelly – writing
 Jem Godfrey – production

 Martin Harrington – additional production, mixing
 Ash Howes – additional production, mixing
 Bill Padley – production
 Billy Steinberg – writing
 Richard Wilkinson – guitar

Charts

Weekly charts

Year-end charts

References

2002 songs
2003 singles
Atomic Kitten songs
Innocent Records singles
Pop ballads
Songs written by Billy Steinberg
Songs written by Susanna Hoffs
Songs written by Tom Kelly (musician)
Virgin Records singles